Rabati Malik, also called Ribat-i Malik, is a caravanserai ruin located on the M37 road from Samarkand to Bukhara about a kilometer west of the edge of Malik, Navoiy Province, Uzbekistan. It was constructed along the Silk Road according to the orders of Karakhanid Shams al-Mulk Nasr, son of Tamgachkhan Ibragim, who ruled in Samarkand from 1068 until 1080.

Site description

The portal of the caravanserai – which is one of the most ancient places among the Central Asia portals – peshtak with the central lancet arch of the niche in which there is a rectangular doorway. The arch concludes with a П-shaped frame, executed from carved terracotta in the form of eight final stars connected with each other, limited by intertwining tapes. The ring is decorated by Arabic inscriptions. On overhanging walls, under the layers of repair plaster, the remains of ancient ganched plasters with figures of vegetative characters are traced.

The portal, as well as all caravanserais, has been laid out from adobe brick with the subsequent facing baked bricks measuring 25х 25 х 4 cm in size, on the ganched solution. The average height of the kept walls ranges from 0,4 up to 0,7 m. The caravanserai occupies – 8277 sq. m.

History
Rabat-i Mâlik holds a special place in the history of Iranian architecture. This is due to its impressive façade treatment of ornamental embedded cylindrical columns on the walls flanking the main entrance portal. The large, brick semi-columns were connected at the top by arches—a rare façade decor found on the flanking walls of the 2500-year-old Apadana palace at Persepolis, and at such Parthian and Sasanian monuments such as Firuzabad. The only other building of the Islamic period that contains such a treatment, is found on the minaret of Jarkurgan/Dzharkurgan in the neighbouring Surkhondaryo province of Uzbekistan.

Regrettably, except for the entrance portal that was badly damaged, the earthquake of 1968 totally demolished what was left of the rest of the rabat, including the landmark flanking walls with the semi-column decorations. Luckily, detailed monochrome photographs are available of the old flanking walls to document this landmark building and help with accurate restorations in the future.

World Heritage Status
This site was added to the UNESCO World Heritage Tentative List on 18 January 2008, in the Cultural category.

See also
Ribat, Arabic word for Early Muslim frontier fort, later caravansary and Sufi retreat

Notes

References

Central Asia
Uzbekistani culture
Caravanserais
Tourist attractions in Uzbekistan
World Heritage Tentative List
Buildings and structures in Uzbekistan